Nediyiruppu is a region of the Kondotty municipality in Malappuram district, Kerala, India. Important places in Nediyiruppu village are Musliyarangadi, Colony Road Junction (previously noted as Nediyiruppu landmark), Kottukkara, Meleparambu, Chiryil Chungam, Kodangad, and Kuruppath. Historically, Nediyiruppu was important as the capital Zamorin dynasty. Nediyiruppu Swaroopam Road, in Poyilikkave, was named in remembrance of that heritage.

History
Nediyiruppu was the headquarters of the Zamorin rulers of the Kingdom of Calicut (the kingdom was called Nediyiruppu Swaroopam at that time).

According to some other historians, the wealth of Manavikrama royalty was kept in a treasury at Nediyiruppu and they called the place Nedi-Iruppu meaning "Got-and-placed". This treasury was located in Viruthiyil Paramba in Nediyiruppu.

Nediyiruppu village is a part of the Kondotty municipality.

Demographics
 India census, Nediyiruppu had a population of 30,462 with 14,859 males and 15,603 females. In 2015, Nediyiruppu Grama Panchayath and Kondotty Grama Panchayath merged to form a new Kondotty municipality.

Most of the people of this village are farmers. Some of them also work in Persian Gulf countries. The village of Nediyiruppu becomes very lively in the evenings with crowded streets and noisy bazaars. There is a very good level of affluence in the village because of remittances from workers in the Persian Gulf region.

The biggest Harijan colony in the state of Kerala is located in Nediyiruppu village, on a hillock called Colony Road.

Administration
Nediyiruppu village merged with the Kondotty municipality in 2015. It is now a part of the municipality.

Health
In June 2015, the local government published a guide on health education for the use of teachers of 3rd to 10th standards. This handbook, titled Amrith, contains instructions on hygiene, infectious diseases, safe drinking water, lifestyle, diseases, chemistry in the kitchen, and healthy food.

Suburbs and villages
 The main town in Nediyiruppu is Musliyarangadi. It is on the main road between Calicut and Malappuram. The road junction has a turnoff to Arimbra Hills. The town has a Juma Masjidh called Pandikashala Juma Masjidh and a madrassa called Quvvathul Islam Madrassa.
Mongam and Moayur are two villages lying between the towns of Musliyarangadi and Valluvambram. Morayur, in Malayalam, means "Land of peoples who have manners". Thinayancherry Elayath, a native of Morayur, was a minister of one of the Zamorin kings. Anwarul Islam Women's Arabic College is an Arabic college located in Mongam and is affiliated to the University of Calicut. The college programs include afzal ul ulama preliminary, BA (Afzal ul Ulama), and MA in Arabic.
At Valluvambram Junction the road from Kozhikode meets Manjeri Road and Malappuram Road. Manjeri Road goes to Nilambur, Ooty, and Mysore. Malappuram Road goes to Guruvayur and Thrissur. Despite the importance of the junction, the village of Valluvambram remains very rural, except for some large commercial developments on the sides of the main roads.
 Other suburbs are Kodangad, Kuruppath, Pothuvettypara, Kottukkara, Mongam, Morayur, Arimbra Hills, Millumpady, Iruveengal, Colony Road, Ozhukur, Thurakkal, Kolathur, and Thalekkara.

Schools
Nediyiruppu village has eleven schools.

 G.M.U.P. School, Chirayil.
 G.W.L.P. School, Nediyiruppu.
 Vakkathody Primary School, Millumpady.
 Dhevadhar U.P. school, Musliyarangadi. 
 Government Primary School, Charamkuthu. 
 Government Primary School, Kottukkara.
 Cheruparambu Primary School.
 Kottukkara High School: Panakkad Pokoya Thangal Memorial Higher Secondary School, Kottukkara, was established in 1976. It has 4,000 students in 55 divisions.

Social organizations
 Mohamed Abdurahiman Library, Kottukkara.
 Misbahudhuja Madrassa, Musliyarangadi.
 Irshadhul Muslimeen Library, Musliyarangadi. 
 Musliyarangadi Public Library.
 Islahi Library.
 C.H. Mohammed Koya Library.
 Moulana Mohammedhali Library.
 Souhrdha Vedhiu, 20th Mile.
 Thanima Samskarika Vedhi, Kurupath.
 Crescent Arts and Sports Club, Chirayil.
 Nibrasul Islam Madrassa, Chirayil.
 Nediyiruppu Lions Club

Transportation

Nediyiruppu village connects to other parts of India through Feroke town on the west and Nilambur town on the east. National Highway 66 passes through Musliyarangadi, connecting to Goa and Mumbai, to the north, and to Cochin and Trivandrum, to the south. State Highway 28 starts at Nilambur and connects to Ooty, Mysore, and Bangalore through state highways 12, 29, and 181.

The nearest major railway station is at Feroke. The nearest airport is at Kozhikode.

Economy
The main income of the village is from remittances from Persian Gulf countries like Saudi Arabia. A large number of the locals also work in the agrarian sector. Small industries like hollow bricks, wood cutting, granite quarries, and matchbox units exist in the village. The only available petrol bunker is located at Kurupath Junction.

Culture
Nediyiruppu village has six temples, 20 mosques, and 21 Madrassas. It is a predominantly Muslim area, with Hindus in comparatively smaller numbers, so the culture of the locality is based upon Muslim traditions.

People gather in mosques for evening prayer and continue to sit there after the prayers, discussing social and cultural issues. Business and family issues are also sorted out during these evening meetings. There are many libraries attached to mosques that are a rich source of Islamic studies. Some of the books are written in Arabi-Malayalam which is a version of the Malayalam language written in Arabic script.

Duff Muttu, Kolkali, and Aravanamuttu are common folk arts of this locality.

The Hindu minority maintains their traditions by celebrating various festivals in their temples. Hindu rituals are performed here with a regular devotion, as in other parts of Kerala.

Tourist attractions
Poyilikkave Karinkali Temple is an ancient temple in Nediyiruppu that was constructed during Zamorins period. The capital of the Zamorins was at Nediyiruppu Swaroopam, which made this temple important. The Thalapoli festival worshipping Goddess Karinkali Devi is held in December of every year.
Pandikashala Mosque in Musliyarangadi is the biggest mosque in the village. The mosque has intricate carvings of verses from the Quran on doors and windows. There is one Dargah of a holy man in this mosque.
Thiruvonamala Temple, near Harijan Colony Road.
Chirayil Chungath Jumaeth Palli, 400 years old, with a 250-year-old carved Mimbre.
Ayyappa Temple, Chirayil.

Mini Ooty Hills

It is a  steep climb from the main road. Mini Ooty can be accessed from Musliyarangadi, Colony Road, Pookkottoor, or Vengara. The route to Mini Ooty passes other small villages, such as Melaparamba, Angadi, Thazhe Colony, Moochikundu, Poolappees and Thiruvonamoola. The roads are in good condition, and a moderately large number of visitors come to see the rolling hills and scenic views. There are many stone crushers and plantations atop the hills. There is an old Dalit colony on the western side of the hill. The hilltop colony in this village was marked officially as Neidiyiruppu on a milestone placed at the road junction. This junction is called Colony Road Junction, after the Harijan colony, Kerala's first, in this village.

Location

See also
 Kondotty
 Valluvambram Junction
 Arimbra
 Pookkottur
 Kottukkara School

References

Cities and towns in Malappuram district
Kondotty area